The wife or daughter of the Bengali kumar or potter creates all products which do not involve the use of the wheel. They also paint all the products that are painted in the potter's family workshop, the ghata, sara or pot cover, dolls etc. In the weavers household the women do almost all else except work on the loom. However, women have never been part of the artisan tradition of the country. They have never been part of a guild. There were never any female swarnakar(goldsmith), sutradhar(carpenter) or takshak(carver). The economic structure of producer and consumer relationship that is current in the country has always been male-centristic. Yet the first painter that finds mention in Sanskrit literature is Chitralekha, who had run of the inner chambers of the Bana king of Pragjyotishpura. The painting skills of the companions of Radha find repeated mention in Vaishnava literature."The touch of the Bengali woman's dexterous hands is to be found in all of Bengal's folk arts. About the culinary arts, Dineshchandra Sen says that the artistic skills woman shows in making sandesh(a sweetmeat) is such that they achieve the beauty of flowers and fruits. There are hundreds of moulds made of clay by Bengali women, their decoration are a pleasure to behold. The dexterity they show with the coconut kernel cannot be appreciated by any one who has not seen the coconut sweets made by the women of East Bengal.

History
Though there are many different materials used in the diverse fields that women artists of Bengal work in, there is a kind of similarity to be found in the designs. Nakshikantha (fig. 1.9), nakshipitha, pati, ghata, hari etc. are wares that are decorated and in their motifs we notice the reflection of the alpana designs. The alpana designs painted with rice paste on the ground seem to be painted also in the pithamade of rice powder with the thorn of the date palm, jute stick or thin slat of bamboo. This pitha is mainly made in Mymensingh, Comilla, Sylhet, Dhaka and Chittagong (fig.1.8). The Bengali woman creates her varied world of art with the world she knows and the symbols she learns. The poet Jasimuddin saw the woman's art world in a wider form, The painting that we see in the lines of the alpana on the ground, we observe similar pictures in stone slabs, in the decorated wooden piece of the carpenter, in the tattoo on bodies, jewelry, in colorful kanthas and the fine cane knots of the house. Though the methods of creating pictures are different in different places there is a similarity in their tradition.

Woman's entrance into the world of mainstream art is largely against social conditions. The sort of art that women are prepared to create is completely different from high or mainstream art. This is due to the indisputable fact that women and men are different. They are different even though they belong to the same society, family and environment because in the patriarchal society where they grow up, there is great discrimination between them from the very beginning. This discrimination channelizes the aesthetic consciousness and view of life in different directions. Heide-Goetner Abendroth has written. As matriarchal art derives from the structure of matriarchal mythology which is a completely different value system and not merely a reversed or contradictory one from that of patriarchy, it too shares this different system of values. The erotic is the dominant force and not work, discipline, renunciation. The continuation of life as a cycle of rebirth is its primary principle, and not war or heroic death for abstract, inhuman ideals. Thus woman's primary aesthetic consciousness is used to hold patriarchal society together. This positive female force nurtures patriarchy with love because woman's consciousness and therefore her art is never self-centered. Woman always works at a level which is generally understandable and easily accessible. Her art and life is never separated. The separation of art and life in patriarchal society has divided mainstream or high art into many different branches. In fact, woman's matriarchal values are cooperative and universal at the core of which is the desire to awaken fertile energy. This value system works as an undercurrent in patriarchal society in the conscious and sub-conscious states of woman. This matriarchal value system has been recast by patriarchy for its own purpose. Thus, when woman enters the world of art created by the male, she enters it going against her training and instincts. The enormous and extraordinary maternal energy of woman becomes a separated, individual entity when a woman enters the unknown world of male created aesthetics; she enters the competition on unequal terms. Often we find women who show great promise in their art education but cannot later keep pace in the actual world of mainstream art. This world of art seems to be very difficult to harmonize with social pressure, family life and child rearing. This world of pure art separated from the flow of life seems to be at odds for a woman to manage while leading a normal family life. That is why we often observe women leaving art divorced from life and society and leaning towards applied art. Perhaps because the self-centeredness, self-consciousness and sense of self-esteem of women do not develop along the same lines as males that this situation is created. Women are forever busy trying to satisfy others. She finds fulfillment by being secondary herself and bringing happiness, peace and taking care of the family. It is impossible to find a place in the world of art with this attitude. Thus, if we study the lives of women who do find a place in the world of art we find a sudden break of a few years in their professional life. Perhaps they are busy rearing children as mothers or trying to adjust to a new role in a new family or keeping herself in the background to give preference to her husband's profession.

Bangladeshi woman artists in Exhibition
The first time we hear of a large number of women participating in an art exhibition is in 1879 in the Fine Art Exhibition held in Kolkata. Twenty five women participated in this show and most of them were Bengali women. 17 In 1939 women were provided the opportunity to enroll as students in the Calcutta Government Art School and they took it with pleasure. Aparna Ray was a student of the first batch of women and went on to become a teacher at the same school. Yet we meet with women prior to the professional entrance of women in the field of art who had worked with the materials and technique of professional artists and also expressed their individual qualities in their work. Needless to say not be said that they practiced art alongside their family activities. Perhaps that is why there is distinctiveness in their work. Moreover, the women's art that was practiced so far was created fora different world and had different objectives. Thus, the art of these women artists shows the desire to find their own space within these contradictions. It must be remembered that the entrance into this new field was for women almost like an act of trespassing because it created an opportunity to encounter the public world outside the premises of the household.

Colonial era
The arrival of the British created a new self-realization and analytical vision that changed the background of Bengali life. Perhaps a touch of this new wave inspired women with new enthusiasm to take up the media and forms in which men had expressed their creativity. It must, however, be mentioned here that this is the juncture in time, that is the nineteenth century, when the visual art of Bengal became separated from the previous hereditary family workshops and people from the upper classes began to enter the arena of the arts. A new personality, the artist, appeared as a result of the exhibitions, art organizations, art educational institutions and the writings on art organized by the British. They were a different brand of people from the lower caste chitrakar(painter), bhaskar(sculptor), kumar(potter), malakar(garland maker). They were different from the common person, talented, educated and unique. They were enlightened creators. It is as though women also rode this wave to enter the world of mainstream art with the children of other well-born families. Yet men entered it aspiring to be professional, major, famous and rich artists. Women entered it suddenly as they saw the possibility of creating art in permanent media instead of sewing, weaving, cooking or painting alpana. It was not in the hopes of professionalism, wealth and fame because those doors were still closed to women. On the contrary, it was to express their own hopes and philosophy of life that women entered the newly opened world of art. Women are seen working in the recognized mainstream media coming out of the area of what is termed the 'minor arts' in the history of western art. The words of Germaine Greer are very significant in this respect. In her discussion of women painters she says, Even if it is not great female art, women's art reveals much that is of interest and concern both to the feminist and to the student of art, whether it shows the impoverishment of the oppressed personality, the sterile archetypes of self-censorship, the grimace of narcissistic introversion or the occasional flicker of rebellion in its latent content, or all of these. What it does not and cannot show is the decisive evidence of female creative power, for by far the greater proportion of that was never expressed in painting, but in the so-called minor arts. What is also observed in women artists is the fact that they seem to devote themselves more to artworks related to society and life rather than expressing themselves as individuals. It is as if their social values direct them to think that art has to address life, it has to be liberated from being products for the museum or the market. It is almost like their devotion to the rites of brata of the most ancient matriarchal society where forces are controlled for the good of society and the family. Woman has been more active in the development of human society, not the self.

Modern era
We know the names of a few women artists. Yet in most cases we hardly see works of art to go with the artists. The reason is that women have created art as a hobby along with their other family responsibilities. They were in most cases not solely devoted to art. Thus, the number of work they produced was comparatively much less than that of males. It is therefore difficult to forma clear view of their work. We may hear about their work but there is very little scope of viewing their work. That is why the work of women artists is mostly unknown, unrecognized, unanalyzed and unevaluated. When woman proves her extraordinary qualities, her personality overwhelms her work and becomes more important. Her work becomes only a facet of her personality. All of this has to be considered when the works of women artists are evaluated, or else the work of half the population of Bengal, and the world will be neglected. Most women artists come from educated upper or middle-class families. A short discussion of some Bengali women artists prior to the partition follows.

Girmdramohini Dasi (1858–1924)
Girmdramohini Dasi was born in Kolkata. Her father was Haranchandra Mitra. She wrote poetry and painted. She was accomplished in painting divinities and landscapes. Lady Minto, wife of the Viceroy saw one of her paintings and sent it to Australia to a painting exhibition. Her paintings were reproduced in her own books of poetry and in Bharati, Manashiand Marmabani journals.

Sucharu Devi (1874–1959)
Sucharu Devi was the Maharani of Mayurbhanj. She was the third daughter of Keshabchandra Sen and Jagonmohim Devi. She learnt oil painting from a European woman teacher called Short. After her marriage to Maharaja Sriramchandra Bhanj Deo she became more enthusiastic about art and gained experience about western art in Europe. She was adept at painting landscapes in oil. In a collection of paintings called Bhakti-Arghashe (fig. 1.10) Painting by illustrated her father's childhood. She Sunayani Devi expressed the grief of the death of her husband and son and the pain of her own lonely life in her paintings...

Sunayani Devi (1875–1962)
Sunayani Devi was born at the Tagore residence in Jorasanko. She was the sister of Gaganendranath, Samarendranath and Abanindranath. Her husband Rajanimohan Chattapadhyaya was an attorney. She had no teacher for her art. She was encouraged by her elder siblings to begin her journey in the world of art, but she became more productive after reaching the age of thirty. After her marriage she practiced her art alongside taking care of and directing her children, husband and the joint family. In her paintings in water color myths of gods and goddesses, Krishna, Ramayana and Mahabharata were the subject. The image of the Bengali household and portraits of women was the subject of her work. Kamal Sarkar has said that her paintings are executed in the original local style and based on the pata painting. The Indian Society of Oriental Art organized a number of exhibitions of her paintings in Europe but she had no shows at home during her lifetime. The inspiration of folk art that we observe in her painting (fig. 1.10) was later more fully explored by Jamini Roy. It was perhaps because she had no desire to establish herself as a great artist that experimentation and originality were boldly present in her work. She was a prolific worker using thrown away cardboard to covers of exercise books. This shows her easy and spontaneous attitude towards her work. Kishore Chatterjee comments, '. . . Sunayani Devi painted straight from her heart and her matriarchal duties could not prevent her from creating a world of simple and innocent pleasures, an art whose beauty lies in its total lack of pretentiousness, in its quiet originality.

Meherbanu Khanam (1885–1925)
Meherbanu Khanam was born in the Nawab family of Dhaka. Her father was Nawab Sir Khwaja Ahsanullah and her mother Kamrunnessa Khanam. Meherbanu sent in one of her paintings for printing in the journal Moslem Bharat published from Kolkata. It is learnt that the poet Kazi Nazrul Islam composed his poem Kheyaparer Tarani upon seeing this painting. The age and family into which Meherbanu was born and grew up, her conservative Muslim background made her painting most unexpected (fig. 1.11). Perhaps she did not depict living beings in her paintings due to religious reasons. She was used to viewing the painting collection of the nawab family. Her father was a very cultured person which is perhaps why her inclination for art developed. No other paintings are traceable except for the two published in the Moslem Bharat. Both the paintings are landscapes. Syed Emdad Ali writes that Meherbanu Khanam took painting lessons for six months. Meherbanu would paint amidst the endless activities of the household.

Shukhalata Rao (1886–1969)
Shukhalata Rao was the eldest daughter of Upendrakishore Ray and Bidhumukhi Devi. She got her training in painting from her father and painted scenes and characters from the Puranas, Ramayana and Mahabharata. Her paintings were published in Prabasi, Modern Review, Suprabhat, Sandesh, Chatterjee's Picture Album and other journals.

Hasina Khanam (1892-?)
Hasina Khanam has been mentioned as the first Muslim woman artist in the Charitabhidhan published by Bangla Academy. Some watercolors and sketches done by her were published in Sawgat, Basumati etc. journals. Her place of birth and death and the date of her expiry is unknown.

Protima Devi (1893–1969)
Protima Devi was born in the home of her maternal uncles. Her father was Sheshendrabhushan Chattapadhyay and mother Binoyini Devi. Her maternal grandfather was Gunendranath Tagore. Gaganendranath, Samarendranath and Abanindranath were her maternal uncles and Sunayani Devi was her aunt. She was married to Rabindranath's son Rathindranath and she later learnt painting at 'Bichitra' established by Rabindranath. She went on to train under Nandalal Bose. She was dearly loved by the poet Rabindranath and traveled to many countries with him. As a result, the concept she got about the international world of art played a particularly significant role in her later life as an artist. She learnt fresco painting, ceramics and batik in Paris. She had a show in London in 1935. However, she is given greater importance for her contribution to Santiniketan than her work as an artist. She designed stages for plays and costumes in her original style. She was particularly proficient in producing characters for Rabindranath's plays. She developed her artistic personality through dance and music. Though her early paintings evidence Japanese influence, later she painted in the style of the Bengal School. She took the illustrative mode of the Bengal School to its natural culmination (fig. 1.13). She continued her individual experiments in applied art. According to Kishore Chatterjee she suppressed her creativity as an illustrator due to herd emotion to Santiniketan.

Shanta Devi (1893–1984)
Shanta Devi was born in Kolkata. Her father was Ramananda Chatterjee editor of the journals Prabasi, Modern Review and Bishal Bharat and her mother was Monorama Devi. She began to write and paintfrom her childhood due to the family environment. She learnt painting under Abanindranath and Nandalal Bose. Later on in Santiniketan she studied painting supervised by Nandalal. There she also studied the technique of oil painting under Andre Karpelles. Shanta Devi painted in the Indian style but the subject she selected reflected her originality (fig. 1.12). She played the esraj, wrote and stitched kantha(quilted embroidery). Her paintings were exhibited and won awards in Kolkata, Madras and Yangon. She was nearly ninety years old when her paintings and other art pieces were exhibited at the Birla Academy.

Shukumari Devi (died 1938)
Shukumari Devi's father was the zamindar of Borodia of Chanpur-Comilla, Ramkumar Majumdar and her mother was Anandamoyi Devi. Shukumari was widowed at the age of fourteen and three years later she went to Santiniketan at the encouragement of Kalimohan Ghose of Sriniketan. Because of her skill in needlework and alpana Rabindranath directed Nandalal to employ Shukumari as the teacher of needle art in Kala Bhavana. Additionally, she also learnt to paint from Nandalal. Episodes from the Puranas, gods and goddesses were the prime subject of her paintings. Kamal Sarkar notes that her paintings executed in bright colors and bold lines are slightly decorative. She was also highly skilled in alpana and other crafts.

Prakriti Chattapadhyay (1895–1934)
Prakriti Chattapadhyay was the daughter of the artist Jaladhichandra (fig. 1.12) Shanta Mukhapadhyay who was the grandson of Jatindramohan Tagore. She painted scenes Devi, Child with a Doll from Krishnalila, Bhuddha's life and the poetry and stories of Rabindranath Tagore in watercolors. She was skilled in gesso painting, painting on silk, lacquer work and enameling. Her embroidery and alpana were featured in publications.

InduraniSinha (1905-?)
InduraniSinha was born in Kolkata. Her father was Akshay Kumar Mitraandmother Rajlakshmi Devi. She was married to the artist Satishchandra Sinha in 1920 and nearly sixteen years after that she began to practice art supervised by her husband. She worked in oils, watercolor and pastels. She was adept in painting landscapes, village people, and nude and draped figures. In 1941 she established a school of art for women.

Gouri Bhanj (1907-1998)
Gouri Bhanj, daughter of Nandalal Bose and Sudhira Devi learnt the art sand crafts at the Kala Bhavana of Santiniketan. When Shukumari Devi, the teacher of the Crafts department was taken ill and had to leave Santiniketan, Gouri Devi took charge and taught at the department for nearly thirty five years. She was very expert in alpana, needlework, batik, leather work and other crafts. Batik was introduced to Kala Bhavana during her tenure and her contribution to the medium is considerable. She played a leading role in the decoration on different occasions during Rabindranath's lifetime.

Indiradevi Roy Chowdhury (1910–1950)
Indiradevi Roy Chowdhury was the daughter of Srishachandra Bhattacharya and Binodini Devi of Gopalpur, Tangail. She was married to the musician Kumar Birendra Kishore Roy Chowdhury of Gouripur, Mymensingh. She learnt painting from Kshitindranath Majumdar after her marriage and learnt portrait painting from Atul Bose. Her paintings, done in oil and watercolors, have been exhibited in many shows. She received the best prize among women in the category of painting in the Indian style at the eleventh yearly exhibition of the Academy of Fine Arts, Calcutta.

Indusudha Ghose
Indusudha Ghose's first lessons in painting were from a photographer in Mymensingh. She went to Santiniketan in 1926 and practiced the arts and crafts during the principalship of Nandalal Bose. She was successful in painting, decoration and needlework. She was the only female member of the organization 'Karushangha' founded by the artists of Santiniketan. She joined Sriniketan as a teacher after completing her studies in Kala Bhavana. From 1931 to 1932 she taught art at the Nivedita Girls School of Kolkata as instructed by Nandalal Bose. She was also associated with revolutionary activities and was in prison for five years. In later life she worked with Mahila Shilpa Shikshalay and Nari Sheba Shangha to develop self-reliance among impoverished women.

Hashirashi Devi
Hashirashi Devi was born in Gobardanga of Twenty Four Parganas. Her father was a lawyer from Dinajpur. She was interested in art from her childhood and became introduced to Abanindranath. The grief of the death of her only daughter found expression in many of her paintings. Her paintings were published in journals such as Bharatbarsha, Masik Basumati, Bichitra, Jayasri, Prabartak. She became well known for her humorous stories and their caricaturist illustrations.

Jamuna Sen (1912-2001)
Jamuna Sen, Nandalal's youngest daughter learnt painting, fresco, modeling and lino cut for six years at Kala Bhavana under the guidance of her father. She was skilled in alpana, needlework and batik. She was a teacher of the crafts department of Kala Bhavana. Her paintings were published in various monthly magazines.

Rani Chanda (1912-1997)
Rani Chanda, sister of Mukulchandra Dey, was born in Midnapore. She came to Kala Bhavana in 1928 and studied painting and had the fortune of being supervised by Nandalal Bose and Abanindranath Tagore. She worked in the media of watercolor, tempera, crayon, chalk, woodcut and linocut. She was incarcerated for her involvement in the 'Quit India' movement.

Chitranibha Chowdhury
Chitranibha Chowdhury was born in Murshidabad in 1913. Her father was Dr. Bhagabanchandra Bose and mother was Saratkumari Devi. Paternal home was in Chandpur, Tripura. She was married to Niranjan Chowdhury of Noakhali in 1927. After marriage, inspired by her husband, she studied painting for almost five years at Kala Bhavana under the principalship of Nandalal Bose. In 1935 she completed her studies and joined Kala Bhavana as teacher to resign after a year. Episodes and characters from ancient Indian literature were featured in her paintings. Rural Bengal and the life of the indigenous people were also included in her work. Most of her work was rendered in watercolors and pastels.

Kamini Sundari Paul
Kamini Sundari Paul was wife of Shashibhushan Paul, founder of the Maheshwarpasha School of Art in 1940. She joined the school as a teacher ofneedlework. She won recognition for her embroidered paintings. She had no institutional training. She was born in Khalishpur, Khulna in 1883. Her father was called Raichan Das. The subject of her paintings were portraits of famous personalities and historical incidents like the Battle of Plassey.

After the partition of India in 1947, what is the present Institute of Fine Art under the University of Dhaka was founded as the 'Government Institute of Arts' in 1948. The first five women admitted to this institution in the 1954–55 session were Tahera Khanam, Rowshan Ara, Hasina Ali, Jubaida Akter Khatun and Syeda Moyeena Ahsan. Except Moyeena Ahsan all the others completed their five-year course. All these women came from urban and enlightened families except for Jubaida Akter. It is known that there was never any opposition from their families for setting off in the world of art. Tahera Khanam later married the famous artist Qayyum Chowdhury and continues to paint (fig. 1.15). It must be admitted that these women must have been very courageous and self-confident to disregard the curious gaze of society and take up the study of such an unusual subject. It is also true that later on women who did study at art institutions did not apply their training to visibly creative activity. Many did not complete their academic studies. It does not seem easy to combine the social and familial responsibilities of women with mainstream art practice. Thus only the women who have dispensed with social and family life and only as long as they have done so have they been able to contribute to mainstream art. In this respect Novera Ahmed is an exceptional personality of this country. She returned to the country after finishing her diploma in sculpture from England in 1956. She practiced sculpture which was not only not in circulation; it could also cause religious controversy. Sculpture came a long way with her sincerity and dedication. She researched into the uncommon material of cement and iron rod. Moreover, she conducted many experiments with folk subject and form (fig. 1.14). The first sculpture exhibition, the first outdoor sculpture and creating the first relief mural on a public edifice in Dhaka all goes to her credit. She was also involved in creating the national Shaheed Minar, monument to the martyrs of the Language Movement. She caused these revolutionary incidents to happen in Dhaka between 1956 and 1960 and possibly left for West Pakistan due to the lack of patronage. However, the combination of the folk trend with internationalism and her clear concept of the contemporary western art world gave her the boldness to step on the threshold of many new doors. Perhaps because she grew up in a truly international and enlightened environment, her identity and her patriotic ideas were not burdened by the shackles of inferiority. Moreover, as a woman she did not have the pressure to achieve social recognition and professional success. This is perhaps why she could so spontaneously continue in her experiments. She is the first modern sculptor of Bangladesh. The teachers and administration of the government art institute was still very wary of introducing sculpture in the curriculum in fear that people would begin to think that they were encouraging un-Islamic practices in a Muslim country. The first woman to have a solo painting exhibition in Dhaka was Durre Khanam. She was better known as Rumi Islam because of her marriage to the artist, Aminul Islam. Later they were divorced. Her exhibition was held in 1960 two years after completing her education at the Institute of Fine Art. This exhibition featured works in the medium of oil and tempera and the paintings showed a clear bend towards abstraction (fig. 1.16). The exhibition was highly acclaimed by Zainul Abedin, A.L. Khatib and Sadeq Khan. Her work showed great promise but she later completely disappeared from the art world of Bangladesh. We notice in both the cases of Novera Ahmed and Rumi Islam that they entered the world of male-centric art even though they were women. Great talent, firmness and dedication must have followed them in their footsteps. Yet as they went considerably against social mores to enter this male controlled realm, they could not last there for very long. Similarly, the new horizons that they pointed to and their historical importance were not to be evaluated by patriarchal society. To be quite truthful, they were almost completely lost.

Farida Zaman (born 1953) 
Dr. Farida Zaman is a Professor and Chairman at the Department of Drawing and Painting of Faculty of Fine Arts, University of Dhaka. She achieved her BFA at Bangladesh College of Arts and Crafts in 1974. In 1978 she gained a MFA froim Maharaja Sayajirao University in Baroda, India and her Ph.D from Visva Bharati University, Santiniketan, India. She has received many awards and honours, including a cultural award from Australian government. Dr Zaman has held five solo exhibitions and participated in many group exhibitions both at home and abroad. She was the first female lecturer at what has become the Faculty of Fine Art, Dhaka University, and was the first female Director (Dean) there. As well as being known for her oil paintings, acrylic painting and her watercolours, she has had a long career as an illustrator. Taught by Bangladesh's premiere illustrator Hashem Khan.

Rokeya Sultana (born 1958)
Rokeya Sultana showed increased activity from the nineties. Her work became distinguished by the depiction of her self-realization andher lived experience. She represented her daily struggle in the known surroundings of her city. Her images are similar to child art. Syed Manzoorul Islam specifies, 'Her works . . . draw strength from primitive sensibility or from a child's unrestricted vision. She works in prints and other media. Rhythmic lines and figurative imagery lends distinction to her work. Woman's existence, experience and the sensory world from a woman's perception are the materials that make up her work.

Akhtar Jahan (born 1958)
Akhtar Jahan is one among a few women sculptors. She grows more productive from the nineties. Childhood memories, the environment and nature have found a place in her work. She works in cement, bronze, sheet metal, wood, terracotta etc. media. A simple abstraction of elements and figures from her known world distinguished her work.

Dilara Begum Jolly (born 1960)
Dilara Begum Jolly has continued to represent social reality directly in her work. She has given form to social contradiction, oppression, inequalities and injustice in pictorial language. Among her chosen themes, discrimination against women and her feministic viewpoint is constantly and explicitly presented in her work. The style of her work is very simple and unrestrained. Her emotions and insight are more active in representing her subject than intellectual analysis. Jolly portrayed the horrors of the Iraq war with great spontaneity in a series of paintings in mixed media. The content and objective are the driving forces of Jolly's work. Yet, in the distinctive language of art she employs, the purity of art is ever present due to the spontaneous combination of form and content. Jolly's work is also very individual in terms of language. The interior of the woman's body as felt by herself is boldly presented in her work besides the external form of the woman (fig. 1.24).

Fareha Zeba (born 1961)
Fareha Zeba in her show entitled Homage to Frida Kahlo of 1998 sought her history as a woman artist through the work of the Mexican artist, Frida Kahlo. The pain of Frida's tragic life seems to stretch across the barriers of time and space and speaks for Zeba. The notable aspect of this exhibition was a woman's tribute, empathy andcompassion foranother woman. Zeba's work also portrays the oppression anddiscrimination against women and women who have successfully surmounted these obstacles. Her form is figurative and her use of medium expresses dynamic swiftness. She expresses the power and strength of women in her depictions of women who have
left their mark on time (fig. 1.27).

Ferdousi Priyabhashini (born 1947)
Ferdousi Priyabhashini (born 1947) is a self-taught artist. She began to work in the nineties. In the early stages her creations made of wood, roots, leaves etc. collected from nature were aimed at decorating her household. Later she began exhibiting in group shows and held a number of solo exhibitions. She breathes meaning into natural objects of meaningless beauty and harmonizes diverse objects. It is almost instinctive in women to recycle used material. This tendency is seen in her work as in the traditional nakshikantha of Bengal.

Atia Islam Anne (born 1962)
Atia Islam Anne has single-mindedly painted on the subject of the inferior status of women in society. Her form and language are unique. She uses seemingly surreal elements, but they are not born of the sub-conscious. She uses and establishes particular symbols which represent the oppression and helplessness of women in society (fig. 1.28). The elements used in her composition come quite close to reality, but not exactly and a variety of geometric lines and shapes create a shallow and unreal space in her canvas. According to Abul Mansur, `. .. to understand an artist like Anne one must consider herfemininity or else the assessment will not be complete ... woman is at the center of the entire pictorial space.

Niloofar Chaman (born 1962)
Niloofar Chaman is another female artist who has completely ignored the language of established mainstream art in Bangladesh and gone her own way. Niloofar's colors are sharp, her forms figural, floating in water and in the process oftransformation. Humans, animals and plants are portrayed with equal importance on her canvas. It is as though they are not separated, but pervade each other. The endless cycle of sexuality and reproduction in a water-flooded universe gives her work a distinction (fig. 1.26). Abul Mansur wrote, 'Although she is deeply hurt and revoltedby the organized barbarities and depravity of man, she adopts the means of allegorical expressionism, rather than the direct statement, for her intensely subjective feelings.' Traditional symbols such as the hand, lotus etc. are used in her current work. Her installations are also significant.

Kanak Chanpa Chakma (born 1963)
Kanak Chanpa Chakma's source of inspiration is the daily life of the Chakma people and the natural beauty of her birthplace, Rangamati. She uses the accepted language of mainstream art to represent traditional subjects (fig. 1.29). The different activities of women are the prime focus of her work.

Nasima Haque Mitu (born 1967)
Nasima Haque Mitu has selected the carving technique in sculpture. Her work is unique for the use of very simple and pure yet meaningful and symbolic forms (fig. 1.30). It is as if the intent is to seek inner meaning, not to explain. Her work expresses the dichotomy and the relationship between the male and the female in a very subtle way.

References

1. Robert Skelton, 'Folk Art Other than Paintings and Textiles' in Robert Skelton and Mark Francis (eds.) Arts of Bengal: The Heritage of Bengal and Eastern India, (London 1979), 57.
 2. Sila Basak, Banglar Brataparban, (Calcutta1998), 2.
3. Niharranjan Roy, Bangalir Itihas: Adiparba, (Calcutta1990), 483.
4. Ibid., 484.
5. Pupul Jayakar, The Earth Mother, (Calcutta1990), 117.
 6. Stella Kramrisch, 'Foreword,' ibid.,21.
 7. Sudhansu Kumar Ray, The Ritual Art of the Bratas of Bengal, (Calcutta 1961), 42.
 8. S. Basak, op.cit., 35.
 9. Ibid., 29.
 10. P. Jayakar, op. cit., 42–43.
 11. Dineshchandra Sen, Brihatbanga, Vol. 1,(Calcutta 1993), 425.
 12. Ibid., 426.
 13. Jasimuddin, 'Pallishilpa' in Mihir Bhattarchaya and Dipankar Ghose (eds.), Bangiya Shilpa Parichoy, (Kolkata 2004),50–58.
 14. Mohammad Sayeedur Rahman, 'Decorative Arts,' in An Anthology of Crafts of Bangladesh, Dr. Enamul Haque (ed.), (Dhaka 1987), 28.
 15. Jasimuddin,op. cit., 50.
 16.  Heide-Goettner Abendroth, 'Nine Principles of Matriarchal Aesthetics,' in Art and Its Significance, An Anthology of Aesthetics, David Ross (ed.), (New York 1994), 568.
 17.  Partha Mitter, Art and Nationalism in Colonial India 1850–1922, (Cambridge 1994), 75.
 18.  Jogesh Chandra Bagal, 'History of the Govt. College of Art and Craft,' Centenary Government College of Art and Craft Calcutta, (Calcutta 1966), 49–50.
 19.  Germaine Greer, The Obstacle Race, (New York1979), 7.
 20.  Kama] Sarkar, Bhorater Bhaskar O Chitrashilpi, (Calcutta1984), 50.
 21.  Ibid., 217.
 22.  Ibid., 221.
 23.  Kishore Chatterjee, 'Three Women Painters of Bengal,' in The Crafts of Bengal and Eastern India, R. P. Gupta (ed.), (Calcutta 1982), 84.
 24. Anupam Hayat, Meherbanu Khanam, (Dhaka 1997), 54.
 25.  Ibid., 56.
 26.  Ibid., 66.
 27.  K. Sarkar, op. cit., 216.
 28.  A. Hayat, op. cit., 59.
 29.  K. Chatterjee, op. cit., 84–85 and K. Sarkar, op. cit., 109–110.
 30.  Vide K. Sarkar, Ibid., 199 and K. Chatterjee, Ibid., 85.
 31.  K. Sarkar, Ibid., 216.
 32.  Ibid., 108.
 33.  Ibid., 26–27.
 34.  Ibid., 54.
 35.  Ibid., 25.
 36.  Ibid., 27.
 37.  Ibid., 236.
 38.  Ibid., 169.
 39.  Ibid., 187.
 40.  Ibid., 57.
 41.  Mohammad Nazrul Islam Aghrani, Shilpi Shashibhusanpal O Maheshwarpasha School of Art, unpublished dissertation (1988), 18.
 42.  'Rumi Islam a Woman Painter,' Contemporary Arts in Pakistan, Vol. 11, No. 4 (Winter 1961).
 43.  Nasim Ahmed Nadvi, 'Introduction,' She a Group Art Exhibition, (Dhaka 1994).
 44.  Anna Islam, 3rd Solo Show, Naima Hague, (Dhaka2000).
 45.  Abul Mansur, Dipa Haq Ekak Chitra Pradarshani, (Dhaka1998).
 46.  S. Manzoorul Islam, Sojourn Exhibition of Works by Rokeya Sultana, La Galerie, Dhaka.
 47.  Forms and Elements, Unity and Diversity, compiledand edited by Nasimul Khabir, (Dhaka 2006).
 48.  Abul Mansur, Anne 2000, 1st Solo Painting Exhibition, (Dhaka2000).
 49.  Abul Mansur, Niloofar Chaman Drawings in Mixed Media1994, Dhaka.
 50.  Loc. cit.

Bengali women artists
Women's organisations based in Bangladesh
Bangladeshi women painters